The Ninth Census of Bolivia is the national census of Bolivia conducted in 1992.  The population was 6,420,792.

References 

1992 in Bolivia
Bolivia
Censuses in Bolivia